Cheetara is a fictional character from the fictional ThunderCats franchise.

1985 series

Cheetara is the sole adult female member of the Thundercats. Cheetara is based on the cheetah. Her powers are superspeed and psychic powers. She is also a skilled fighter with the baton/bo staff weapon.

2011 series

In the 2011 rebooted version of ThunderCats, Emmanuelle Chriqui voiced Cheetara. Cheetara's powers are similar to her 1980's counterpart but given an expanded background with her being part of a secret clergy.

Thundercats Roar

Cheetara in the 2020 version of ThunderCats is portrayed as the bravest and the most competent fighter of the Thundercats.

Reception
Cheetara has had a mostly positive reception from critics. Comic Book Resources ranked the character among 11th Best thing about ThunderCats. io9 ranked Cheetara 2nd best thing about ThunderCats. The character is so popular the Hollywood actress Milla Jovovich is interested in portraying Cheetara in any potential live action adaptation of ThunderCats. Comic Book Resources consider Cheetara the 10th most valuable Thundercats toy.

References

Anthropomorphic animal characters
Female characters in animated series
Fictional bojutsuka
Fictional characters who can move at superhuman speeds
Fictional characters who have mental powers
Fictional characters who use magic
Fictional cheetahs
Fictional clergy
Extraterrestrial characters in television
Fictional humanoids
Fictional psychics
Fictional refugees
Fictional women soldiers and warriors
Television characters introduced in 1985
ThunderCats